is a Japanese garden located next to the Sanbutsudō Hall of Rinnō-ji Temple in Nikkō. It  was constructed in early Edo period, but reformed in the beginning of 19th century. The garden was given its name by a Confucian scholar Issai Sato. There is a pond containing carp in the middle; stone lanterns, bridges, bamboo fences, a pagoda, and a small tea house adorn the garden. 

Shōyō-en Garden was designed to look like Lake Biwa and the surrounding scenery in Shiga Prefecture known as the "Eight Views of Omi".

References

External links

 Shōyō-en Garden at the Nikko Tourist Association

Japanese strolling gardens
Gardens in Japan
Nikkō, Tochigi
Gardens in Tochigi Prefecture